Peter Malcolm Galton (born 14 March 1942 in London) is a British vertebrate paleontologist who has to date written or co-written about 190 papers in scientific journals or chapters in paleontology textbooks, especially on ornithischian and prosauropod dinosaurs.

With Robert Bakker in a joint article published in Nature in 1974, he argued that dinosaurs constitute a natural monophyletic group, in contrast to the prevailing view that considered them polyphyletic as consisting of two different not closely related orders, thus initiating a revolution in dinosaur studies and contributing to the revival of the popularity of dinosaurs in the field of paleontology.

Publications
 

 Galton, P.M., 1974, "The ornithischian dinosaur Hypsilophodon from the Wealden of the Isle of Wight". British Museum (Natural History), Bulletin, Geology, London, 25: 1‑152c.
 Bakker, R.T. and Galton, P.M. (1974). "Dinosaur monophyly and a new class of vertebrates". Nature 248:168-172.
 Galton, P.M. (1982). "The postcranial anatomy of stegosaurian dinosaur Kentrosaurus from the Upper Jurassic of Tanzania, East Africa". Geologica et Palaeontologica 15:139-165.
 Galton, P.M. (1984). "Cranial anatomy of the prosauropod dinosaur Plateosaurus from the Knollenmergel (Middle Keuper, Upper Triassic) of Germany. I. Two complete skulls from Trossingen/Württ. With comments on the diet". Geologica et Palaeontologica 18:139-171.
 Galton, P.M. (1985). "Cranial anatomy of the prosauropod dinosaur Plateosaurus from the Knollenmergel (Middle Keuper, Upper Triassic) of Germany. II. All the cranial material and details of soft-part anatomy". Geologica et Palaeontologica 19:119-159.
 Galton, P.M. (1986). "Prosauropod dinosaur Plateosaurus (=Gresslyosaurus) (Saurischia: Sauropodomorpha) from the Upper Triassic of Switzerland". Geologica et Paleontologica 20:167-183.
 Galton, P.M. (1988). "Skull bones and endocranial casts of stegosaurian dinosaur Kentrosaurus HENNIG, 1915 from Upper Jurassic of Tanzania, East Africa". Geologica et Palaeontologica 22:123-143.
 Galton, P.M. (1990). "Basal Sauropodomorpha-Prosauropoda". pp. 320–344 in Weishampel, D.B., Dodson, P. and Osmólska, H. (eds.): The Dinosauria. University of California Press, Berkeley
 Galton, P.M. (2000). "The prosauropod dinosaur Plateosaurus Meyer, 1837 (Saurischia, Sauropodomorpha). I: The syntypes of P. engelhardti Meyer, 1837 (Upper Triassic, Germany), with notes on other European prosauropods with "distally straight" femora". Neues Jahrbuch für Geologie und Paläontologie, Abhandlungen 216(2):233-275.
 Galton, P.M. (2001). "The prosauropod dinosaur Plateosaurus Meyer, 1837 (Saurischia: Sauropodomorpha; Upper Triassic). II. Notes on the referred species". Revue Paléobiologie, Genève 20(2):435-502.
 Galton, P.M. and Upchurch, P. (2004). "Prosauropoda". pp. 232–258 in Weishampel Weishampel, D.B., Dodson, P. and Osmólska, H. (eds.): The Dinosauria 2nd Edition. University of California Press, Berkeley.

References

British palaeontologists
British science writers
1942 births
Living people
British textbook writers